Sunil Kumar Thakur (born 15 October 1984) is an Indian footballer. He is currently playing for East Bengal F.C. in the I-League in India as a powerful and reliable defender.

External links
 

Indian footballers
1984 births
Living people
Footballers from Punjab, India
JCT FC players
East Bengal Club players
Association football defenders